Talking Through Tin Cans is the first studio album by Berkeley, California-based indie pop band The Morning Benders, currently known as POP ETC. It was released in 2008 on +1 Records.

It was named best indie/alternative album of 2008 by iTunes.

Track listing
 "Damnit Anna" – 1:58
 "I Was Wrong" – 3:19
 "Loose Change" – 3:02
 "Patient Patient" – 2:32
 "Crosseyed" – 2:47
 "Waiting for a War" – 2:38
 "Heavy Hearts" – 3:51
 "Boarded Doors" – 3:27
 "Wasted Time" – 3:25
 "Chasing a Ghost" – 3:53
 "When We're Apart" – 1:31

References 

2008 albums
The Morning Benders albums